The Mayar River is one of the tributaries of the Bhavani in Tamil Nadu, South India.
The Mayar river originates from a small town called Mayar off the Masinagudi–Ooty road. This is a natural line of separation between the state of Karnataka and Tamil Nadu and a separation between the forest of Bandipur National Park and the Mudumalai sanctuary to the south. The river flows into the gorge below Theppakadu in a roaring waterfall called Mayar Falls. This river is checked by Bhavanisagar Dam on the plains near Satyamangalam, along with the Bhavani River.

References

Rivers of Tamil Nadu
Tributaries of the Kaveri River
Rivers of India